Kumbor is a small town in the municipality of Herceg Novi, Montenegro.

Demographics
According to the 2003 census, the town had a population of 1,067 people, 47,89% Serbs, 31,30% Montenegrins and 3,56% Croats.

According to the 2011 census, its population was 925.

References

External links

Populated places in Herceg Novi Municipality
Populated places in Bay of Kotor